Haloferax lucentense is a halophilic archaeon in the family of Haloferacaceae.

References

Archaea genera
Archaea described in 2004